Thirunelvennai Sri Swarnakadeswarar Temple
(நெய்வணை சொர்ணகடேஸ்வரர் கோயில்
)is a Hindu temple located at Neivanai in Villupuram district, Tamil Nadu, India. The presiding deity is Shiva. He is called as Swarnakadeswarar. His consort is known as Neelamalar Kanniammai.Gurukkal mobile number 7826-090451

Significance 
It is one of the shrines of the 275 Paadal Petra Sthalams – Shiva Sthalams glorified in the early medieval Tevaram poems by Tamil Saivite Nayanar [[
Sambandar]].

References 

Shiva temples in Viluppuram district
Padal Petra Stalam